Hazem Ahmed Shehata (born 2 February 1998), is a professional footballer who plays as a midfielder for Qatar Stars League side Al-Wakrah. Born in Egypt, he represents Qatar at international level.

Career statistics

Club

Notes

International

International goals

Qatar U23

References

External links

1998 births
Living people
Qatari footballers
Association football midfielders
Lekhwiya SC players
Al-Duhail SC players
Umm Salal SC players
Al Ahli SC (Doha) players
Al-Wakrah SC players
Qatar Stars League players
Qatar international footballers
Qatar youth international footballers